Portlick Motte  is a motte and National Monument located in County Westmeath, Ireland.

Location

References

Archaeological sites in County Westmeath
National Monuments in County Westmeath